Michael Hunter Brown (born 1965), is a Scottish medievalist lecturing at the University of St Andrews. In 1991 he was the recipient of the Royal Historical Society's David Berry Prize. His volume on the reign of King James I of Scotland led to the award of the Agnes Mure prize for Scottish history. Brown's work is concentrated on late Medieval Scotland and its nobility. He is married to Margaret Connolly who also works at the University of St Andrews as a medievalist.

Select bibliography
 James I. Tuckwell Press. 1994
 Black Douglases: War and Lordship in Late Medieval Scotland, 1300-1455. Tuckwell Press. 1998
 Earldom and kindred: the Lennox and its earls, 1200-1458 - Steve Boardman & Alasdair Ross (editors)
 The exercise of power in medieval Scotland, c. 1200-1500. Four Courts Press. 2003
 
 
 Disunited Kingdoms: Peoples and Politics in the British Isles 1280-1460, Pearson. 2013

References

External links
 St Andrews staff page

Living people
1965 births
Academics of the University of St Andrews
Historians of Scotland
Place of birth missing (living people)
20th-century Scottish historians
21st-century Scottish historians